Conex may refer to:

Conex box, an intermodal container for shipping and storage
Connectivity exchange, the exchange of information concerning routes to radio stations
Conex, a trade name for meta-aramid fiber
Conex Sat Ltd, a cable television company in Romania
The Conex, a play featuring actor Kahlil Joseph

See also
 Connex (disambiguation)